This is a list of notable events in country music that took place in the year 1979.

Events
 March 2 - Queen of Country Music, Loretta Lynn is named ACM Artist of the Decade after the dominant hold Lynn held on the charts during the decade. Lynn is the only female ACM Artist of the Decade.
 March 3 — The Public Broadcasting Service (PBS) would telecast an entire Saturday night live from the Grand Ole Opry for the very first time – the show would last until 12:30 am with a half-hour break between the two shows at 9 pm CDT. The show featured many acts including Del Reeves, Barbara Mandrell, Bill Monroe, Hank Snow, Roy Acuff, Minnie Pearl, Don Gibson and many others. The telecast became the most popular one of the year for PBS, and was a part of their March fundraising campaigns.
 December 21 — The Electric Horseman, starring Robert Redford and Jane Fonda, premieres. Willie Nelson is a supporting character in the film, and he will contribute to the movie's soundtrack.

Top hits of the year

Number one hits

United States
(as certified by Billboard)

Notes
1^ No. 1 song of the year, as determined by Billboard.
A^ First Billboard No. 1 hit for that artist.
B^ Last Billboard No. 1 hit for that artist.
C^ Only Billboard No. 1 hit for that artist to date.

Canada
(as certified by RPM)

Notes
1^ No. 1 song of the year, as determined by RPM.
2^ Song dropped from No. 1 and later returned to top spot.
A^ First RPM No. 1 hit for that artist.
B^ Last RPM No. 1 hit for that artist.
C^ Only RPM No. 1 hit for that artist.

Other major hits

Singles released by American artists

Singles released by Canadian artists

Top new album releases

Christmas albums

Births
 February 1 — Julie Roberts, country music singer-songwriter.
 April 24 — Rebecca Lynn Howard, pop-styled singer-songwriter of the late 1990s and early 2000s.
 May 18 – David Nail, singer of the 2010s best known for "Let It Rain."
 June 10 — Lee Brice, singer-songwriter of the 2010 best for his hits "Love Like Crazy" and the number-one single  "A Woman Like You" as well as his 2012 second studio album Hard 2 Love.
 July 24 – Jerrod Niemann, songwriter who wrote Garth Brooks' hit "Good Ride Cowboy" before achieving his own success with hits like "Lover, Lover."

Deaths
 January 8 — Sara Carter, 80, lead singer and member of the pioneering Carter Family.
 February 21 — Carl T. Sprague, 83, "The Original Singing Cowboy," active mainly in the 1920s.
 May 11 — Lester Flatt, 64, early bluegrass pioneer who, with Earl Scruggs, formed the Foggy Mountain Boys. (heart failure)
 November 29 — Jimmie Tarlton, 87, one half of Darby and Tarlton, an early country music duo.

Country Music Hall of Fame Inductees
Hubert Long (1923–1972)
Hank Snow (1914–1999)

Major awards

Grammy Awards
Best Female Country Vocal Performance — Blue Kentucky Girl, Emmylou Harris
Best Male Country Vocal Performance — "The Gambler", Kenny Rogers
Best Country Performance by a Duo or Group with Vocal — "The Devil Went Down to Georgia", Charlie Daniels Band
Best Country Instrumental Performance — "Big Sandy/Leather Britches", Doc Watson and Merle Watson
Best Country Song — "You Decorated My Life", Debbie Hupp and Bob Morrison (Performer: Kenny Rogers)

Juno Awards
Country Male Vocalist of the Year — Ronnie Prophet
Country Female Vocalist of the Year — Carroll Baker
Country Group or Duo of the Year — The Good Brothers

Academy of Country Music
Entertainer of the Year — Willie Nelson
Song of the Year — "It's a Cheating Situation", Sonny Throckmorton and Curly Putman (Performer: Moe Bandy)
Single of the Year — "All the Gold in California", Larry Gatlin
Album of the Year — Straight Ahead, Larry Gatlin
Top Male Vocalist — Larry Gatlin
Top Female Vocalist — Crystal Gayle
Top Vocal Duo — Joe Stampley and Moe Bandy
Top New Male Vocalist — R. C. Bannon
Top New Female Vocalist — Lacy J. Dalton

Country Music Association
Entertainer of the Year — Willie Nelson
Song of the Year — "The Gambler", Don Schlitz (Performer: Kenny Rogers)
Single of the Year — "The Devil Went Down to Georgia", Charlie Daniels Band
Album of the Year — The Gambler, Kenny Rogers
Male Vocalist of the Year — Kenny Rogers
Female Vocalist of the Year — Barbara Mandrell
Vocal Duo of the Year — Kenny Rogers and Dottie West
Vocal Group of the Year — The Statler Brothers
Instrumentalist of the Year — Charlie Daniels
Instrumental Group of the Year — Charlie Daniels Band

Further reading
Kingsbury, Paul, "The Grand Ole Opry: History of Country Music. 70 Years of the Songs, the Stars and the Stories," Villard Books, Random House; Opryland USA, 1995
Kingsbury, Paul, "Vinyl Hayride: Country Music Album Covers 1947–1989," Country Music Foundation, 2003
Millard, Bob, "Country Music: 70 Years of America's Favorite Music," HarperCollins, New York, 1993
Whitburn, Joel, "Top Country Songs 1944–2005 – 6th Edition." 2005.

Other links
Country Music Association
Inductees of the Country Music Hall of Fame

External links
Country Music Hall of Fame

Country
Country music by year